Kuwa or KUWA  may refer to:

Places 
 old name of Dhrangadhra (princely State) in (British) India
 alternative spelling Quba (also Guba), city in Azerbaijan, capital of the :
 Quba Rayon (district) of Azerbaijan
 Quba Khanate (1726–1806), a quasi-independent principality

Other uses 
 
 , two destroyers of the Imperial Japanese Navy
 
 Kuwa (weapon), one of the many Okinawan weapons, based on a hoe
 KUWA, an American radio call sign
 Kuwa language (disambiguation)

People with the name
 George Kuwa (1885–1931), Japanese and American Issei film actor of the silent era
 Yousif Kuwa (1945–2001), Sudanese revolutionary and politician